Myth Makers: Trixie in Toyland is a 2005 platform video game for the Microsoft Windows, PlayStation 2, and Nintendo Wii. The game was created by UK-based Data Design Interactive.  It is the third and final part of the Myth Makers franchise of video games.

Gameplay
Players control Trixie, the main character in the game. In order to proceed to the next level, players must collect eight power rods to activate a teleporter while being attacked by various enemies. When the player completes a level and plays it again, a menu appears with a second mode available, ‘Score Pickups’. If the level is completed again in this mode, the player will unlock ‘Time Attack’ mode. Completion of this mode unlocks the ‘Hidden Pickups!’ alternative mode.

Plot
The story follows Trixie, the Easter Bunny cadet who chases down Penumbra (a tyrant) who has stolen the Myth Makers Orbs and taken over the Toyland. Trixie has to retrieve the stolen Orbs, defeat the evil Penumbra and save Toyland.

Reception
The game was panned by reviewers. IGN gave it a 1.4/10 stating sarcastically that it's "really just a fantastic title like Ninjabread Man and Anubis II; everyone should experience Trixie in Toyland just as everyone should experience throat cancer".

References

2005 video games
Video games developed in the United Kingdom
Data Design Interactive games
Fantasy video games
Wii games
3D platform games
PlayStation 2 games
Single-player video games
RenderWare games
Video games about toys
Video games featuring female protagonists
Conspiracy Entertainment games
Metro3D games